Sari-su, Sary-su. Sara-su, Sarısu, Sarisu, Sarysu, or Ṣáríṣú, the name means yellow water in Turkic languages, may refer to:

Azerbaijan
 Lake Sarysu, Azerbaijan's largest lake
 Sarısu, Beylagan, a village and municipality in Beylagan Rayon
 Sarısu, Goygol, a village and municipality in Goygol Rayon
 Sarısu, Imishli, a village in Imishli Rayon

Crimea
 Sary-su (Alma), a tributary of the Alma River

Iran
 Sari Su, Iran, a village in the Central District of Poldasht County, West Azerbaijan province
 Sari Su Rural District, Maku County, West Azerbaijan province

Kazakhstan
 Sarysu (river), in Kazakhstan
 Sarysu District, Kazakhstan

Russia
 Volga River, in Russia

Turkmenistan
 Sumbar River, in southern Turkmenistan

Turkey
 Sarısu, Kahta, a village in the District of Kahta, Adıyaman Province
 Sarısu, Çubuk, a village in the District of Çubuk, Ankara Province
 , a village in the District of Kiraz, İzmir Province; see List of populated places in İzmir Province